Roberto Bruno Stillo (born 15 March 1991) is a Canadian professional soccer player.

Career

Professional
After several loan spells during his time with Genoa he moved on a free transfer July 7, 2013 to Parma where he was subsequently loaned to Perugia. On October 6, 2013 Stillo was forced into the game in the 32nd minute after starting keeper Jan Koprivec was sent off,  Stillo immediately had to face a penalty kick. While he was unable to stop the spot kick, nine-man Perugia did manage to scrape out a 2–2 draw.

International
Stillo made his Canadian U-20 debut against Rwanda on September 26, 2009. On 18. January 2013 earned his first call-up for the Canadian national men's soccer team but failed to make an appearance in the two matches against Denmark and  United States.

References

External links
 
 

1991 births
Living people
Canadian soccer players
Canadian expatriate soccer players
Canada men's youth international soccer players
Association football goalkeepers
Soccer players from Mississauga
League1 Ontario players
Genoa C.F.C. players
Paganese Calcio 1926 players
Parma Calcio 1913 players
A.C. Perugia Calcio players
Woodbridge Strikers players
Sigma FC players